A sack usually refers to a rectangular-shaped bag.

Sack may also refer to:

Bags
 Flour sack
 Gunny sack
 Hacky sack, sport
 Money sack
 Paper sack
 Sleeping bag
 Stuff sack
 Knapsack

Other uses
 Bed, a slang term
 Sack (band), an Irish band
 Sack (comics), a Marvel Comics villain
 Sack (surname), a surname
 Sack (unit), an English unit of weight or mass used for coal and wool
 Sack (wine), a type of white fortified wine
 Sack, Zurich, a village in the Swiss canton of Zurich
 Sacks (surname)
 Sackcloth (Hebrew sak), a fabric mentioned in the Bible
 Selective acknowledgement (SACK), in computer networking
 Ball sack, slang for scrotum
 Dismissal (employment), slang term for being fired
 Looting, the indiscriminate taking of goods by force, particularly during war
 Quarterback sack, tackling the quarterback behind the line of scrimmage in American and Canadian football
 Sack jacket, another term for a lounge jacket

See also
 Sack of Rome (disambiguation)
 Sacking out, horse-training method
 Sad Sack, American fictional comic strip and comic book character created by Sgt. George Baker during World War II
 Sock (disambiguation)
 Sach, a Vietnamese ethnic group